Vionica is a village in the municipality of Ivanjica, Serbia. According to the 2011 census, the village has a population of 204 inhabitants.

References

Populated places in Moravica District